Mary Jackson (November 22, 1910 – December 10, 2005) was an American character actress whose nearly fifty-year career began in 1950 and was spent almost entirely in television. She is best known for the role of the lovelorn Emily Baldwin in The Waltons and was the original choice to play Alice Horton in the daytime soap opera Days of Our Lives, playing the part in the unaired pilot. The role was instead given to Frances Reid.

Biography
Jackson was born in the village of Milford, Michigan on November 22, 1910. She graduated from Western Michigan University with a bachelor's degree 1932.
She worked for one year as a schoolteacher during the Great Depression before pursuing her interest in theatre.

She returned to college, enrolling in Michigan State University's fine arts program and subsequently beginning her performing career in summer stock theatre in Chicago. She embarked on a television career in New York City in the 1950s, during the first Golden Age of Television, before beginning work in Hollywood in the 1960s.

Jackson appeared on Broadway in such hits as “Kiss and Tell” and “Eastward in Eden,” was standby for Wendy Hiller in “Flowering Cherry” on Broadway, playing the role twice. She toured nationally in “Apple of His Eye” with Edward Arnold, and in “The Heiress” with Basil Rathbone. Jackson was a member of the Chicago company of Tennessee Williams' “Garden District” and also toured with the play; was featured with Shirley Booth in Chicago in “The Desk Set.” (Jackson would later be a guest star on Booth's TV show, Hazel.) Her many stock engagements included the Ann Arbor Spring Festival, Bucks County Playhouse, Ogunquit Playhouse, Alley Theatre in Houston. For the 1962 and 1963 Summer stock seasons she performed at the Elitch Theatre.

Always close to her Michigan roots, Jackson was a charter member of the Milford Historical Society. In 1988, Jackson was instrumental in raising money to rebuild the Oak Grove Cemetery Bridge over the Huron River - a bridge that connects her hometown of Milford to its oldest burial grounds. Jackson was buried there  following her death from Parkinson's disease in Los Angeles, two-and-a-half weeks after her 95th birthday. She was survived by her husband of 68 years, Griffin Bancroft Jr., to whom she was married from July 4, 1937.

Select filmography

1950s
 The Philco Television Playhouse (1952, TV Series) as Aunt Edna
 Robert Montgomery Presents (1955–1956, TV Series) as Mrs. Gross
 Alfred Hitchcock Presents (1956, TV Series) as Mrs. Wilson

1960s
 General Electric Theater (1960, TV Series) as Phyllis Barton
 The Barbara Stanwyck Show (1960, TV Series) as Mrs. Krieger
 Route 66 (1961, TV Series) as Judge Mary Lindstrom
 Hazel (1961, TV Series) as Flora Duncan
 My Three Sons (1961–1962, TV Series) as Irene / Selena Bailey
 Stoney Burke (1962, TV Series) as Mrs. Carrol
 The Twilight Zone (1963, TV Series, Episode: "Of Late I Think of Cliffordville") as Miss Pepper (uncredited)
 The Andy Griffith Show (1964–1966, TV Series) as Miss Vogel / Mrs. Parnell Rigsby
 The Outer Limits (1964, TV Series) as Mrs. McCrae
 The Fugitive (1964–1966, TV Series) as Carolyn Fletcher / Nurse Oberhansly / Ellie Parker
 Please Don't Eat the Daisies (1965, TV Series) as Mrs. MacIntyre
 The F.B.I. (1965–1972, TV Series) as  Ruth Mason / Nurse / Mrs. Dreiser / Mrs. Corman / Mrs. Howard / Mrs. Otto Foshay
 Do Not Go Gentle Into That Good Night (1967) as Mrs. Stone
 Insight (1967, TV Series)
 The Second Hundred Years (1967, TV Series) as Mother Superior
 The Invaders (1967–1968, TV Series) as Hattie Willis / Nurse
 Targets (1968) as Charlotte Thompson
 Lancer (1969, TV Series) as Harpy / Maude Bigelow

1970s
 Airport (1970) as Sister Felice
 Mary Tyler Moore (1971, TV Series) as Mrs. Arnell
 The Name of the Game (1971, TV Series) as Jaimie White
 Wild Rovers (1971) as Sada's Mother
 Cannon (1971, TV Series) as Mrs. Wells
 The Failing of Raymond (1971, TV Movie) as Latin Teacher
 Return to Peyton Place (1972, TV Series) as Nell Abernathy (1973-1974)
 The Trial of the Catonsville Nine (1972) as Witness
 The Waltons (1972-1981, TV Series) as Emily Baldwin
 Kid Blue (1973) as Mrs. Evans
 Blume in Love (1973) as Louise
 Barnaby Jones (1973–1977, TV Series) as Mary Jackson / Hilda Forbes / Karen's Landlady
 Our Time (1974) as Miss Moran
 The Rookies (1974, TV Series) as Mrs. Callender / Woman
 Fun with Dick and Jane (1977) as Jane's Mother
 Audrey Rose (1977) as Mother Veronica
 The Bionic Woman (1977, TV Series) as Martha
 Coming Home (1978) as Fleta Wilson
 Letters from Frank (1979, TV Movie) as Edna Miller
 The Rockford Files (1979, TV Series) as Postal Supervisor

1980s
 A Small Killing (1981, TV Movie) as Rose
 Hart to Hart (1981, TV Series) as Phony Grandma
 A Wedding on Walton's Mountain (1982, TV Movie) as Emily Baldwin
 Quincy The Flight of the Nightingale (1982, TV Series) as Mrs. Shanley
 Between Two Brothers (1982, TV Movie) as Eddy Frazer
 Some Kind of Hero (1982) as Frances
 A Day for Thanks on Walton's Mountain (1982, TV Movie) as Emily Baldwin
 Family Ties (1982, TV Series) as Edna
 Magnum, P.I. (1983, TV Series) as Grandmother MacKenzie
 Hardcastle and McCormick (1983, TV Series) as Sarah Wicks
 The Snow Queen (1985, TV Series) as Grandmother
 Space (1985, TV Mini-Series) as Frankie
 Scarecrow and Mrs. King (1985–1986, TV Series) as Lois Mendelson
 The Jeffersons (1985, TV Series) as Mrs. Donahue
 My Town (1986, TV Series) as Mrs. McDaniel
 Highway to Heaven (1986, TV Series) as Rose
 Hill Street Blues (1987, TV Series)
 Hunter (1987, TV Series) as Clara
 Big Top Pee-wee (1988) as Mrs. Dill
 L.A. Law (1989, TV Series) as Mrs. Weedon

1990s
 Parenthood (1990–1991, TV Series) as Great Grandma Greenwell
 Skinned Alive (1990) as Crawldaddy
 The Exorcist III (1990) as Mrs. Clelia
 Criminal Behavior (1992, TV Movie) as Mrs. Cline
 Leap of Faith (1992) as Emma Schlarp
 A Walton Thanksgiving Reunion (1993, TV Movie) as Emily Baldwin
 Christy (1994, TV Series) as Aunt Polly Teague
 A Walton Wedding (1995, TV Movie) as Emily Baldwin
 Ozone (1995) as Cleaning Lady
 A Family Thing (1996) as Carrie
 A Walton Easter (1997) as Emily Baldwin (final film role)

References

External links
 
 
 Mary Jackson at Elitch Theatre 

1910 births
2005 deaths
American film actresses
American television actresses
American stage actresses
Western Michigan University alumni
Michigan State University alumni
Deaths from Parkinson's disease
Neurological disease deaths in California
People from Milford, Michigan
Actresses from Michigan
20th-century American actresses
21st-century American women